Apopka is a city in Orange County, Florida. The city's population was 55,000 at the 2020 census. It is part of the Orlando–Kissimmee–Sanford Metropolitan Statistical Area. Apopka comes from Seminole word Ahapopka  for "Potato eating place".

Apopka is referred to as the "Indoor Foliage Capital of the World" due to the many greenhouse nurseries there.

History
The earliest known inhabitants of the Apopka area were the Acuera people, members of the Timucua confederation.  They had disappeared by 1730, probably decimated by diseases transmitted through Florida by Spanish colonists.

The Acuera were succeeded by refugees from Alabama and Georgia, who formed the new Seminole Indian tribe.  They called the area Ahapopka. Aha, meaning "Potato," and papka, meaning "eating place". By the 1830s, this settlement numbered about 200, and was the birthplace of the chief Coacoochee (known in English as "Wild Cat").

At the conclusion of the Second Seminole War, the U.S. Congress passed the Armed Occupation Act of 1842, forcing surviving natives at Ahapopka to abandon their village and seek refuge deeper in the wilderness of the Florida peninsula.

The early American settlers built a major trading center on the foundations of the earlier Indian settlement.  Their population was large enough by 1857 to support the establishment of a Masonic lodge. In 1859 the lodge erected a permanent meeting place at what is now the intersection of Main Street (U.S. Highway 441) and Alabama Avenue.

The Lodge
The settlers in the vicinity of "The Lodge" were largely isolated during the Civil War, but the area rebounded once peace was re-established, and a population boom followed the construction of railroad lines through the region.

In 1869, the Apopka Post Office opened.

Town of Apopka City
In 1882, the one mile in each direction of "The Lodge" or "Fudge Hall" was officially incorporated under the name "Town of Apopka City". In the 1890s, the town was contracted in size more than once due to difficult times.

In 1905, the Apopka City Council authorized incorporation of the Apopka Water, Light, and Ice Company. Councilman A.M. Starbird was appointed its manager, but it was not until voters approved a $9,000 bond in 1914 that he was able to contract with International Harvester Corporation to construct a power plant, so electricity was not available in the city until February 10, 1915. This independent utility company was one of many that were acquired by the Florida Public Service Corporation in the 1920s. They continued to manage the city's utility needs until the 1940s, when they sold off its ice plants to the Atlantic Company, its electric service to Florida Power Corporation, and its water services to Florida Utilities.

Between 1937 and 1968 a town ordinance forbade Black residents from living north of the railroad tracks.

Historic buildings
Five buildings in Apopka have been placed on the U.S. National Register of Historic Places through the Apopka Historical Society housed in the Museum of the Apopkans.

Present-day Apopka

Apopka is known for having one of the longest-serving mayors in the United States. John H. Land, first elected in 1949, served for 61.25 years (with a short three-year gap), making him the longest-serving mayor in Florida and longest-serving full-time mayor in the United States through 2014. Apopka is served by the Apopka Police Department within city limits and the Orange County Sheriff's Department for unincorporated Apopka.

On April 8, 2014, Apopka City Commissioner Joe Kilsheimer won the election to succeed John H. Land as mayor. Kilsheimer was sworn in on April 22, 2014. The 2018 primary for mayor resulted in a landslide win for Bryan Nelson with 63.40% (4,103) of the vote to Kilsheimer's 36.6% (2,369). No runoff was required.

Mayors

Development
Apopka is a fast-growing city and is expanding in all directions. Most notable are the new Lowes and Home Depot DIY stores to the north of the city on US 441 in the location of the previous Dunn Citrus grove (the stretch of 441 which runs through the city is named after Fred N. Dunn). Other businesses on the former Dunn Citrus site include Staples office supply and a second Chili's restaurant.

Due to the fast-paced growth of the city, a new hospital, AdventHealth Apopka, was opened in 2017.

The John Land Apopka Expressway (Toll 414) opened on May 15, 2009, relieving some of US 441's traffic, taking the route from what is now the US 441 junction with SR 429, and then passing south of the city to rejoin US 441 at its junction with Maitland Boulevard South of the city.

Expansion of the expressway, including an extension of Toll 414, known as Wekiva Parkway, created a junction at US 441 and Plymouth Sorrento Road. Master plans take the Wekiva Parkway extension further north and then east connecting to Interstate 4 at Sanford. The expansion is scheduled to be completed by 2023. It will then be the shortest route from I-4 to the Disney attractions.

Geography
Apopka is about 16 miles northwest of Downtown Orlando.

Climate

Demographics

As of the census of 2000, there were 26,642 people, 9,562 households, and 7,171 families residing in the city. The population density was 1,108.1 inhabitants per square mile (427.9/km). The racial makeup of the city was 73.85% White, 15.56% African American, 0.42% Native American, 1.89% Asian, 0.09% Pacific Islander, 5.36% from other races, and 2.83% from two or more races. Hispanic or Latino of any race were 18.08% of the population.

There were 9,562 households, out of which 38.2% had children under the age of 18 living with them, 55.8% were married couples living together, 14.4% had a female householder with no husband present, and 25.0% were non-families. 18.6% of all households were made up of individuals, and 5.8% had someone living alone who was 65 years of age or older. The average household size was 2.76 and the average family size was 3.13.

In the city the population was spread out, with 28.2% under the age of 18, 8.6% from 18 to 24, 33.6% from 25 to 44, 19.5% from 45 to 64, and 10.1% who were 65 years of age or older. The median age was 33 years. For every 100 females, there were 94.0 males. For every 100 females age 18 and over, there were 90.1 males.

The median income for a household in the city was $43,651, and the median income for a family was $49,380. Males had a median income of $32,177 versus $26,553 for females. The per capita income for the city was $19,189. About 7.1% of families and 9.5% of the population were below the poverty line, including 12.6% of those under age 18 and 9.7% of those age 65 or over.

In 2010 Apopka had a population of 41,542. The racial and ethnic composition of the population was 49.5% non-Hispanic white, 20.7% African American, 0.3% Native American, 3.2% Asian, 0.1% Pacific Islander, 0.4% non-Hispanic reporting some other race, 3.3% reporting two or more races, and 25.4% Hispanic or Latino of any race.

Education
 Forest Lake Academy, a Seventh-day Adventist high school.
 Apopka is served by Orange County Public Schools with two high schools: Apopka High School and Wekiva High School.
 University of Florida's Institute of Food and Agricultural Sciences Mid-Florida Research and Education Center is located in Apopka.
 The Golf Academy of America (Altamonte Campus), a 2-year golf college is located in Apopka.
 Christian Learning Academy is a private K–12 school offering varsity athletics, music programs, and Model United Nations.

Notable people

Automobile racing

 Fireball Roberts, race car driver
 Wayne Taylor, owner, Wayne Taylor Racing; winner of 1996 and 2005 24 Hours of Daytona, 2005 Rolex Series

Baseball

 Ray Goolsby (war veteran) Washington Senators in Chattanooga, TN
 Zack Greinke, Baseball All-Star (2009, 2014), MLB ERA leader (2009), Gold Glove Award (2014), Silver Slugger Award (2013) and 2009 AL Cy Young Award winner

Basketball

 Joel Berry II, basketball player for the University of North Carolina
 Joe Chealey, Basketball Player

Economics
 Glenn Hubbard, dean, Columbia University Graduate School of Business

Government
 John H. Land longest serving full-time city mayor
 Bryan Richey, member of the Tennessee House of Representatives

Arts

 Brad Linaweaver, science fiction writer, film producer and screenwriter, magazine publisher

Football

 Steve Baylark, NFL running back
 Rogers Beckett Jr., former NFL safety for the San Diego Chargers and the Cincinnati Bengals 
 Alan Gendreau, football placekicker at Middle Tennessee State
 Brandon Meriweather, former NFL defensive back
 Jalen Carter, Georgia Bulldogs All-American defensive tackle
 Warren Sapp, All-Pro NFL defensive lineman
 Sammie Smith, former NFL running back for the Miami Dolphins and the Denver Broncos

Gaming

 Justin McGrath, professional Super Smash Bros. Melee player

Infamous

 Michael Larson, Press Your Luck Scandal winner of $110,237 in 1984

Inventor

 Richard Borg, board game designer

Music

 John Anderson, country singer
 Sawyer Brown, country music band founded in Apopka
 Jonathan Cain, member of multi mega hit rock group Journey, multi-instrumentist and songwriter resides in Apopka
 Jerry Lawson, lead singer of The Persuasions
 Pat Travers tours from, records, and resides in Apopka

Boxing, weightlifting, and wrestling

 Christy Martin, American world champion boxer, resided in Apopka for many years and operated a boxing school 
 Mattie Rogers, Olympic Weightlifter
 Monty Sopp, professional wrestler, former WWF/E

Apopka in art

Literature

Apopka is referenced in Zora Neale Hurston's famous novel, Their Eyes Were Watching God.

Apopka is referenced in Eddie C. Brown's autobiographical book, Beating the Odds: Eddie Brown's Investing and Life Strategies.

History of the greater Apopka and Central Florida area is detailed in William Gladden, Jr's book, The Pennings of Perrine Slim: Stories of Northwest Orange County Florida. Included are 100 pictures of the area, most by Dr Phyllis Olmstead. Olmstead Publishing.

History of Apopka and Northwest Orange County, Florida by Jerrell H Shofner, (1982). Rose Printing. Apopka Historical Society.

Tales of the Big Potato by Jack Christmas (2011). New Book Publishing. Reprint Olmstead Publishing.

Apopka: Images of America photos of the Apopka area, (2004). Apopka Historical Society.

Film
Apopka takes place in and is prominently featured in Johannes Grenzfurthner's horror drama Masking Threshold that premiered at Fantastic Fest in 2021.

References

External links
 
 Apopka Chief, Local newspaper

 
Cities in Orange County, Florida
Cities in the Greater Orlando
Cities in Florida
1882 establishments in Florida
Populated places established in 1882